Cupriavidus yeoncheonensis is a Gram-negative and strictly aerobic bacterium from the genus of Cupriavidus which has been isolated from soil from a ginseng field from Yeoncheon in Korea.

References

 

Burkholderiaceae
Bacteria described in 2015